Chester Gould (November 20, 1900 – May 11, 1985) was an American cartoonist, best known as the creator of the Dick Tracy comic strip, which he wrote and drew from 1931 to 1977, incorporating numerous colorful and monstrous villains.

Early life
Chester Gould was born to Gilbert R. Gould, the son of a minister, and Alice Maud (née Miller). All four of his grandparents were pioneer settlers of Oklahoma. He was a Christian.

Growing up, Gould and his family were members of the United Brethren Church.

His cousin Henry W. Gould is Professor Emeritus of Mathematics at West Virginia University.

Dick Tracy

In 1931, Gould was hired as a cartoonist with the Chicago Tribune and introduced Dick Tracy in the Detroit Mirror on Sunday, October 4, 1931. The original comic was based on a New York detective Gould was interested in. The comic then branched to the fictional character that became famous. He drew the comic strip for the next 46 years from his home in Woodstock, Illinois.

In order to keep informed of police methods, Gould took courses in forensics and investigative procedures. He was later proud of having introduced the two-way wrist radio for Tracy in 1946, and in 1947, the closed-circuit television, both of which were later invented, though in somewhat different forms.

Gould's stories were rarely pre-planned, since he preferred to improvise stories as he drew them. While fans praised this approach as producing exciting stories, it sometimes created awkward plot developments that were difficult to resolve. In one notorious case, Gould had Tracy in an inescapable deathtrap with a caisson. When Gould depicted Tracy addressing Gould personally and having the cartoonist magically extract him, publisher Joseph Patterson vetoed the sequence and ordered it redrawn. The strip also drew protests from those who felt that Gould's depiction of crime was too gruesome, that he poured on too much gore and carnage.

Later in the strip's Gould period, Dick Tracy was widely criticized for being too right-wing in character and as excessively supportive of the police. A handful of critics thought Gould ignored the rights of the accused and failed to support his agenda with an adequate storyline. The late 1950s also saw a newspaper readership growing less indulgent of Gould's politics.

For instance, Gould introduced a malodorous, tobacco-spitting character, B.O. Plenty, with little significant complaint from readers in the 1940s. However, the 1960s introduction of crooked lawyer Flyface and his relatives, surrounded by swarming flies, created a negative reader reaction strong enough for papers to drop the strip in large numbers. There was then a dramatic change in the strip's setting, leaving behind the strip's origins as an urban crime drama for science fiction plot elements and regular visits to the moon. An increasingly fantastic procession of enemies and stories ensued. The Apollo 11 moon landing prompted Gould to abandon this phase. Finally, Dick Tracy was beset by the overall trend in newspaper comics away from strips with continuing storylines and toward those whose stories are largely resolved within one series of panels.

Gould, his characters, and improbable plots were satirized in Al Capp's comic strip Li'l Abner with the Fearless Fosdick sequences (supposedly drawn by "Lester Gooch"); a notable villain was Bomb Face, a gangster whose head was a bomb.

Awards and exhibitions
Chester Gould won the National Cartoonists Society's Reuben Award in 1959 and 1977, and was awarded the Inkpot Award in 1978. The Mystery Writers of America honored Gould and his work with a Special Edgar Award in 1980. In 1995, the strip was one of 20 included in the Comic Strip Classics series of commemorative postage stamps and postcards.

Dick Tracy: The Art of Chester Gould was an exhibition in Port Chester, New York, at the Museum of Cartoon Art from October 4 through November 30, 1978. The exhibition was curated by Bill Crouch, Jr.

From 1991 until 2008, the art and artifacts of Gould's career were displayed in the Chester Gould-Dick Tracy Museum that operated from the Woodstock, Illinois, Old Courthouse on the Square. Visitors to the Museum saw original comic strips, correspondence, photographs, and much memorabilia, including Gould's drawing board and chair. In 2000, the Museum received a Superior Achievement Award from the Illinois Association of Museums, and in 2001, it was given an Award of Excellence from the Illinois State Historical Society. The museum continues today as a virtual museum online.

Gould retired December 25, 1977, and died May 11, 1985, in Woodstock, Illinois, of congestive heart failure. Gould is buried in Oakland Cemetery in Woodstock.

In 2005, Gould was inducted into the Oklahoma Cartoonists Hall of Fame in Pauls Valley, Oklahoma, by Michael Vance. The Oklahoma Cartoonists Collection, created by Vance, is located in the Toy and Action Figure Museum.

A graduate of Northwestern University in Evanston, Illinois, Gould was honored with the naming of the Chester Gould Society for Northwestern University School of Professional Studies donors.

Books
In 1983, two years before Gould's death, his only child, Jean Gould O'Connell, recorded extensive interviews with her father, who spoke at length about his early attempts during the 1920s to get syndicated and the birth of Dick Tracy. These interviews became a major source when she wrote his biography, Chester Gould: A Daughter's Biography of the Creator of Dick Tracy, published by McFarland & Company in 2007.

The entire run of Dick Tracy is being reprinted in a book series by IDW Publishing. The series began in 2006. The first volume includes the five sample strips that Gould used to sell his strip, followed by over 450 strips showing the series' beginning (from October 1931 – May 1933), along with a Gould interview, never previously published, by Max Allan Collins. Twenty-six more volumes in this series have been published between 2006 and 2020, bringing the continuity to July 1974.

References

Further reading

External links
 Commemorative Mural in Pawnee
 NCS Awards
 Article "'Dick Tracy' Turns 75"
 Article "75 years of Continuous Crime-Stopping"
 
 Encyclopedia of Oklahoma History and Culture: Chester Gould
 Essay on "The Gravies" and other Gould creations

1900 births
1985 deaths
American comic strip cartoonists
Chicago Tribune people
Conservatism in the United States
Dick Tracy
Edgar Award winners
Inkpot Award winners
Northwestern University alumni
People from Woodstock, Illinois
People from Pawnee, Oklahoma
People from Stillwater, Oklahoma
Reuben Award winners
Will Eisner Award Hall of Fame inductees